The Clearwater Mountains are part of the Rocky Mountains, located in the panhandle of Idaho in the Western United States.


Subranges

North Clearwater Mountains 
The North Clearwater Mountains is the northernmost and shortest subrange. Only two of its peaks — the  Pot Mountain and the  Black Mountain — rise above .

Selway Crags 
The Selway Crags lie between the North and South Clearwaters both in latitude and mean elevation. The Selway Crags encompass  and its two highest peaks are the  Grave Peak and the  McConnell Mountain.

South Clearwater Mountains 
The South Clearwater Mountains is the southernmost and tallest subrange, with 6 peaks above . The South Clearwaters encompass  and its two highest peaks are the  Stripe Mountain and the  Salmon Mountain.

References 

Ranges of the Rocky Mountains
Mountain ranges of Idaho